Yoosuf is a 2008 Maldivian romantic drama film written and directed by Fathimath Nahula. Produced under Crystal Entertainment, the film stars Yoosuf Shafeeu, Niuma Mohamed, Sheela Najeeb, Mohamed Manik, Ahmed Nimal and Ahmed Lais Asim in pivotal roles.

The film received widespread critical acclaim and was one of the Maldivian all-time highest grossing films. The film was Maldivian official entry at 2009 SAARC Film Festivals and holds the privilege of being the opening movie of the festival.

Plot
Yasir (Ahmed Nimal) reluctantly accepts a mute and deaf man, Yoosuf Ali (Yoosuf Shafeeu) as a servant at his house. His daughters, Usha Yasir (Niuma Mohamed) and Leesa (Zeenath Abbas) have a hard time welcoming a man as an attendant. Realizing their detestation towards him, their grandmother (Fauziyya Hassan) tried to kick him out of the house but Usha ultimately stopped her, sympathizing about his unfortunate situation. As times fly, Usha and Yoosuf shares a romantic attraction towards each other. Yoosuf is then introduced to Aslam (Mohamed Manik), Usha's fiance, which breaks his heart and determined to move back to his island. Before that, their affair was exposed to Yasir where he drags him out of the house.

Anguished, Usha reveals her true affection towards Aslam but decided to marry him fearing it might tarnish her father's reputation otherwise. With the help of her friend, Aree (Mariyam Siyadha), Usha meets Yoosuf minutes before his departure and went to his island along with him which resulted her father disowning her and warning the family never to reach out to Usha. Mary, childhood best friend of Yoosuf who is secretly in love with him was very excited on hearing the news of his return although she was devastated to see Usha with him. Yoosuf and Usha gets married despite her father's disapproval and months later they were blessed with a baby boy, Yoonus (Ahmed Lais Asim). On hearing the joyous news, Yasir comes to take Usha, Yoosuf and Yoonus back to Male'. Considering the fact that, Yoonus will be hailed better in a place like Male', Yoosuf agreed to relocate. Things start to fall apart, when Yoosuf is continuously humiliated by his father-in-law and he moves back to his island with his son.

Cast 
 Yoosuf Shafeeu as Yoosuf Ali
 Niuma Mohamed as Usha Yasir
 Sheela Najeeb as Mary
 Mohamed Manik as Aslam
 Ahmed Nimal as Yasir
 Fauziyya Hassan as Yasir's mother
 Ravee Farooq as Riyaz
 Zeenath Abbas as Leesa
 Ahmed Lais Asim as Yoonus
 Aminath Shareef as Aisth
 Ali Ahmed as Mary's friend
 Aishath Siyadha as Aree
 Aishath Rasheedha as Mary's mother
 Hamid Ali as Yasir's friend
 Roanu Hassan Manik as Yasir's friend
 Ali Shameel as Judge
 Chilhiya Moosa Manik as Adambe
 Aminath Ameela as a school teacher
 Ahmed Saeed as Aslam's friend (special appearance)
 Nadhiya Hassan as gym partner (special appearance)
 Aishath Rishmy Special appearance in item number "Masthee Masthee"

Soundtrack

Accolades

References

2008 films
2008 romantic drama films
Maldivian romantic drama films
Films directed by Fathimath Nahula